Francis Octavius Grenfell, VC (4 September 1880 – 24 May 1915) was an English recipient of the Victoria Cross.

Early life and family
He was born on 4 September 1880 to Sophia and Pascoe Du Pré Grenfell. He was one of fifteen children. He had a twin brother, Riversdale Grenfell, also in the 9th Lancers, who was killed in action in September 1914. Their maternal grandfather was Admiral John Pascoe Grenfell and other relatives included their uncle, Field Marshal Francis Grenfell, 1st Baron Grenfell. An older brother, Lieutenant Robert Septimus Grenfell, 21st (Empress of India's) Lancers, was killed in a cavalry charge during the Battle of Omdurman in 1898. Three other brothers, Cecil Grenfell, Howard Maxwell Grenfell and Arthur Morton Grenfell all reached the rank of lieutenant colonel in the British Army. A cousin, Lieutenant Claude George Grenfell (Thorneycroft's Mounted Infantry) was killed at Spion Kop during the Boer War and two other cousins Julian Grenfell, the poet, and his brother, Gerald William Grenfell, were killed in the First World War.

An Etonian who represented his school at cricket, Grenfell joined the army in 1900 and first served in the Second Boer War in the King's Royal Rifle Corps.

Victoria Cross

Grenfell was 33 years old, and a captain in the 9th (Queen's Royal) Lancers, British Army during the First World War when the following deed during the action of Elouges took place for which he was awarded the VC.

On 24 August 1914 at Audregnies, Belgium, Captain Grenfell rode with the regiment in a charge against a large body of unbroken German infantry. The casualties were very heavy and the captain was left as the senior officer. He was rallying part of the regiment behind a railway embankment when he was twice hit and severely wounded. In spite of his injuries, however, when asked for help in saving the guns, by Major Ernest Wright Alexander of the 119th Battery, Royal Field Artillery, he and some volunteers, under a hail of bullets, helped to manhandle and push the guns out of range of enemy fire. The citation was gazetted on 16 September 1914 and read:

He was killed in action on 24 May 1915 and is buried in the Vlamertinghe Military Cemetery.

Legacy
His Victoria Cross is displayed at the Regimental Museum of the 9th/12th Royal Lancers housed in Derby Museum and Art Gallery, Derby, England.

Polo 
All nine of the Grenfell brothers were accomplished polo players. Francis and his brother, Riversdale Grenfell, were regarded as the best in the family. Francis was rated at an 8-goal handicap. The twin brothers were on the Ranelagh team that won the American Open and on the team Freebooters, alongside Leopold Christian Duncan Jenner and the Duke of Roxburghe, that won the Hurlingham Champion Cup.

References

Further reading

Monuments to Courage (David Harvey, 1999)
The Register of the Victoria Cross (This England, 1997)
VCs of the First World War - 1914 (Gerald Gliddon, 1994)

External links
 
 - (biography)
Coomb, Arthur Grenfell. "Grenfell Family History". Retrieved 2014-01-01.

1880 births
1915 deaths
People educated at Eton College
British Army personnel of the Second Boer War
King's Royal Rifle Corps officers
9th Queen's Royal Lancers officers
British Army personnel of World War I
British World War I recipients of the Victoria Cross
British military personnel killed in World War I
People from Surrey
British people of Cornish descent
Francis Octavus
British Army recipients of the Victoria Cross
English polo players
Military personnel from Surrey